In the field of computer networking, TCP pacing is the denomination of a set of techniques to make the pattern of packet transmission generated by the Transmission Control Protocol less bursty. It can be conducted by the network scheduler.

Bursty traffic can lead to higher queing delays, more packet losses and lower throughput. However it has been observed that TCP's congestion control mechanisms may lead to bursty traffic on high bandwidth and highly multiplexed networks, a proposed solution to this problem is TCP pacing. TCP pacing involves evenly spacing data transmissions accross a round-trip time.

See also 
 Micro-bursting (networking)

References 

Network performance